Best Endeavor, also known as Buena Vista Farm, is a historic home and farm complex located at Churchville, Harford County, Maryland. It is a large, multi-sectioned, mid to late 18th century, partially stuccoed stone telescope house.  It has two primary sections: the western unit, constructed about 1740, is four bays wide and about 1785, a -story, three-bay, side-passage / double parlor block was added against the east gable.  Also on the property and dating from the mid-19th century or earlier are a stone smokehouse, a timber-framed barn with board and batten siding, a timber-framed shed, and the ruin of a large stone and frame bank barn.

It was listed on the National Register of Historic Places in 1990.

References

External links
, including photo from 1990, Maryland Historical Trust website

Houses on the National Register of Historic Places in Maryland
Houses in Harford County, Maryland
Houses completed in 1740
Churchville, Maryland
National Register of Historic Places in Harford County, Maryland
1740 establishments in Maryland